Deidesheim is a Verbandsgemeinde ("collective municipality") in the district of Bad Dürkheim, Rhineland-Palatinate, Germany. The seat of the Verbandsgemeinde is in Deidesheim.

The Verbandsgemeinde Deidesheim consists of the following Ortsgemeinden ("local municipalities"):

Deidesheim
Forst an der Weinstraße
Meckenheim
Niederkirchen bei Deidesheim
Ruppertsberg

Verbandsgemeinde in Rhineland-Palatinate